Stan Wilson may refer to:

Stan Wilson (footballer, born 1912) (1912–2004), Australian rules footballer for Essendon
Stan Wilson (footballer, born 1928) (1928–2002), Australian rules footballer for Richmond
Stan Wilson (born 1948), cricketer who played for South Australia and Western Australia
Stan Wilson, actor in The Day After
Stan Wilson (folk musician), songwriter
Stan Wilson, racing driver in 2010 SCCA Pro Racing World Challenge season

See also
Stanley Wilson (disambiguation)